Niru Kumar is an Indian social activist. In 2021, she was awarded Padma Shri by the Indian Government for her contribution in social work.

Career 
Kumar started her career in 2012 with the work of gender empowerment and diversity. She worked as a senior officer in Central Government Health Scheme for 25 years. In 2020, she was chosen as one of the national icons of the Election Commission of India.

Awards 
 Padma Shri in 2021

References

Living people
Recipients of the Padma Shri in social work
Indian social workers
Year of birth missing (living people)